Hyejong of Goryeo (912 – 23 October 945) (r. 943–945) was the second King of Goryeo. He was preceded by King Taejo and succeeded by Jeongjong, 3rd Monarch of Goryeo.

Early life
Hyejong was born to King Taejo and his second wife, Janghwa of the "Oh" clan.  She was the daughter of the Magistrate of Naju, Oh Da-ryeon.  Taejo met and married her while serving in Naju as a general of Taebong under Gung Ye.

In 921, Hyejong was proclaimed Crown Prince and Royal Successor with support from General Bak Sul-Hui. Almost immediately after being named Crown Prince, Hyejong followed his father Taejo into battle against Later Baekje and played a major role in numerous victories. In 943, Hyejong rose to the throne upon his father's death.

Reign
Hyejong's reign was marked with conspiracy and power struggles among Taejo's sons. The first of these conspiracies was led by Princes Wang Yo and Wang So, sons of Taejo and his third consort, Queen Sinmyeongsunseong of the Chungju Yu clan, which possessed considerable political influence. Upon realizing the conspiracy by the two princes, Wang Gyu warned Hyejong of the conspiracy, but plotted to put his grandson, one of Hyejong's younger half-brothers, on the throne when Hyejong did nothing to stop the conspiracy of the two princes.

Death
Hyejong died in 945, during the second year of his reign from mercury poisoning in his bath water. He had a disease most commonly known as eczema which caused red itchy patches on his skin and difficulty breathing. Although he had a son who was named crown prince, he was succeeded by his third brother Wang Yo, who claimed the throne by force with the backing of their fourth brother Wang So and subsequently crowned as Jeongjong.

Family
Father: Taejo of Goryeo (고려 태조)
Grandfather: Sejo of Goryeo (고려 세조)
Grandmother: Queen Wisuk (위숙왕후)
Mother: Queen Janghwa (장화왕후)
Grandfather: O Da-ryeon (오다련)
Grandmother: Lady Yeon Deok-gyo (연덕교)
Consorts and their Respective Issue(s):
Queen Uihwa of the Jincheon Im clan (의화왕후 임씨)
Prince Heunghwa (흥화궁군)
Lady Gyeonghwa (경화궁부인)
Princess Jeongheon (정헌공주)
Lady Hugwangjuwon of the Wang clan (후광주원부인 왕씨) – No issue.
Lady Cheongjuwon of the Cheongju Gim clan (청주원부인 김씨) – No issue.
Palace Lady Aeiju, of the Yeon clan (궁인 애이주 연씨)
Wang Je (왕제)
Lady Myeonghye (명혜부인)

In popular culture
 Portrayed by Ahn Jung-hoon and Seo Hyun-suk in the 2000–2002 KBS1 TV series Taejo Wang Geon.
Portrayed by No Young-gook in the 2002–2003 KBS1 TV series The Dawn of the Empire.
Portrayed by Kim San-ho in the 2016 SBS TV series Moon Lovers: Scarlet Heart Ryeo.

References

912 births
945 deaths
10th-century Korean monarchs
People from Naju
Korean generals